Identity and Democracy (ID) is a right-wing to far-right political group of the European Parliament, launched on 13 June 2019 for the Ninth European Parliament term. It is composed of nationalist, right-wing populist and eurosceptic national parties from ten European nations. It is the successor to the Europe of Nations and Freedom group formed during the eighth term.

History
In April 2019, the Danish People's Party and the Finns Party (at the time members of the European Conservatives and Reformists) announced their intention to form a new grouping with Alternative for Germany, formerly of the ECR, ENF and EFDD groups, and Italy's League following the 2019 elections. AfD spokesman Jörg Meuthen appeared alongside Northern League leader Matteo Salvini to formally announce the formation of the new European political alliance with the Finns Party and Danish People's Party which was provisionally named European Alliance for People and Nations.

On 12 June 2019, it was announced that the group would be named "Identity and Democracy" (ID), include Italy's League (LSP), the French National Rally (RN) and Alternative for Germany as member parties, and be a successor to the Europe of Nations and Freedom (ENF). The Finns Party also joined the group. Lega MEP Marco Zanni was announced as the new group's chairman. The group, composed at that time of 73 MEPs, was launched in Brussels by RN leader Marine Le Pen on 13 June 2019. It was expanded to include former ENF members Vlaams Belang and the Freedom Party of Austria, as well the new Freedom and Direct Democracy (SPD) party from the Czech Republic and the Conservative People's Party of Estonia.

The Dutch Party for Freedom (PVV) failed to secure any seats at the election; however, it gained one in the post-Brexit apportionment of seats. Before Brexit occurred, Party leader Geert Wilders stated his intention to align the PVV with ID, provided that the post-Brexit apportionment was confirmed by the European Council. PVV MEP Marcel de Graaff subsequently took the seat, but in 2022 defected to the Forum for Democracy, citing his support for the FvD's policies against the COVID-19 vaccine. The FvD accordingly changed it affiliation from the ECR group to Identity and Democracy.

Ideology
The group lists its core priorities as protecting European cultural heritage and the sovereignty of European nations, creating jobs and growth, increasing security, stopping illegal immigration, regulating legal immigration, fighting EU bureaucracy and preventing what it describes as the potential Islamisation of Europe. Identity and Democracy also opposes the possible accession of Turkey to the European Union. The group calls for a Europe based on cooperation and further reforms of the EU through "more transparency and accountability" at Brussels, but rejects any further evolution towards a European Superstate. Political commentators have variously described Identity and Democracy as nationalist, right-wing populist and Eurosceptic, although the group emphasises itself as sovereigntist as opposed to "anti-European".

Group members

9th European Parliament

References

European Parliament party groups
2019 establishments in the European Union
Political parties established in 2019
Right-wing politics in Europe
Right-wing populism in Europe
Far-right politics in Europe